A Reason to Breathe is an EP by the rock band The Esoteric. It was self-released in 2002, and more recently made available via BandCamp.

Track listing
Adapted from album sleeve and Discogs.
 "Our Best Elvis Yet"
 "Strategy Of Luck"
 "Worth The Wait"
 "Eye Child"
 "Flight Of The Botfly"

References

External links
 The Esoteric official website

2002 EPs
The Esoteric albums
Self-released EPs